Francisco Montecillo Padilla (born 17 September 1953) is a Philippine prelate of the Catholic Church who has worked in the diplomatic service of the Holy See since 1985. He represented the Holy See, either as Apostolic Nuncio or Apostolic Delegate, to the several countries on the Arabian Peninsula. On 17 April 2020, he was named Apostolic Nuncio to Guatemala.

Biography 
Francisco Montecillo Padilla was born on 17 September 1953 in Cebu City, Philippines, the tenth of thirteen siblings. He prepared for the priesthood in Cebu, first at the Pope John XIII Minor Seminary and then at the Major Seminary San Carlos. He earned his theology degrees at the University of Santo Tomas Central Seminary in Manila. He was ordained on 21 October 1976 by Cardinal Julio Rosales y Ras. He then continued his studies in Rome, earning degrees at Pontifical University of St. Thomas Aquinas.

He entered the diplomatic service of the Holy See on 1 May 1985. His early assignments took him to Santo Domingo, Venezuela, Austria, India, and Japan.

He was based in Australia when, on 1 April 2006, Pope Benedict XVI appointed him Titular Archbishop of Nebbio and Apostolic Nuncio to Papua New Guinea and the Solomon Islands. On 23 May he received his episcopal consecration from Cardinal Ricardo J. Vidal.

On 10 November 2011, Pope Benedict named him Apostolic Nuncio to Tanzania.

Pope Francis appointed him Apostolic Nuncio to Kuwait and Apostolic Delegate to the Arabian Peninsula on 5 April 2016. He was also appointed Apostolic Nuncio to Bahrain and United Arab Emirates on 26 April 2016. On 30 July 2016, he was appointed Nuncio to Yemen. On 6 May 2017, he was also named Apostolic Nuncio to Qatar.

On 17 April 2020, he was named Apostolic Nuncio to Guatemala.

Notes

See also
 List of heads of the diplomatic missions of the Holy See

References

External links
 Catholic Hierarchy: Archbishop Francisco Montecillo Padilla 

Apostolic Nuncios to Tanzania
Apostolic Nuncios to Kuwait
Apostolic Nuncios to United Arab Emirates
Apostolic Nuncios to Papua New Guinea
Apostolic Nuncios to the Solomon Islands
Apostolic Nuncios to Bahrain
Apostolic Nuncios to Yemen
Apostolic Nuncios to Qatar
Apostolic Nuncios to Guatemala
People from Cebu City
Living people
1953 births
Apostolic vicariates